Adefemi Gbadamosi (born 5 September 1993) also known as Fola David, is a Nigerian medical doctor who doubles as a visual and hyper-realism artist.

Works 
He does speed painting which involves painting people on stage while the canvas is upside down or spinning.

He has worked on canvas for Ooni of Ife Adeyeye Enitan Ogunwusi, Patoranking, Trey Songz, Wale, Keri Hilson, R-kelly, Jidenna, 2face, Iyanya, Dj Jimmy Jatt, Alibaba among others.

To campaign against the social stereotypes of skin disorders his works covers skin imperfections like wrinkles, vitiligo, freckles, stretch marks, ichthyosis and other skin conditions. He raises awareness on medical issues through Fola David Foundation.

Education 
He holds a degree in Medicine and Surgery from the College of Medicine, University of Lagos.

Recognition 
He was nominated for The Future Awards Africa Prize For Art & Culture in 2017. He also spoke at TEDxBellsTech at Bells University in 2018.

References 

1993 births
21st-century Nigerian medical doctors
Living people
21st-century Nigerian painters
University of Lagos alumni